Eccrisis flavicollis is a species of beetle in the family Cerambycidae. It was described by Waterhouse in 1878.

References

Dorcasominae
Beetles described in 1878